Beatrix is a fictional character in the 2000 video game Final Fantasy IX. She is one of its antagonists until later switching to the protagonists' side.

Concept and creation
Beatrix was created for the 2000 video game Final Fantasy IX. Her character design was meant to strike a balance between realism and a comic-like style, while taking inspiration from the style employed for the characters in the film The Dark Crystal.

Appearances
Beatrix appears in Final Fantasy IX. She grew up on a middle-class family in the city of Treno, and she later moves to Alexandria to join its military. She eventually ascended the ranks to general, becoming acquainted with Captain Adelbert Steiner. She loyally served Queen Brahne in her wars, though she eventually betrayed Brahne to help the protagonists, remaining behind with Steiner to allow them to rescue Garnet Til Alexandros XVII, the kingdom's Princess, and escape. Following the Queen's death, Beatrix serves under the newly crowned Garnet. She eventually has a romance with Steiner due to a comedy of errors. She and Steiner defended the city against an attack from a villain named Kuja, but went missing during the chaos. She is later discovered alive in Alexandria, having helped to rebuild the city. She pilots the airship Red Rose in order to protect the protagonists as they enter Memoria, the final area of the game. After the antagonist Necron is defeated, she intends to renounce her position, but Steiner convinces her to stay and help protect Garnet, which leads to them entering a formal relationship.

She received a figurine bundled with one of Freya Crescent from the Square Enix Figure Line series, released in February 2020.

Reception
Beatrix's character has received very positive critical reception, having been a very popular character in Japan and to Final Fantasy fans. She was the 14th highest-ranked female character according to a fan poll organized by Square Enix Japan for the fan favorite female Final Fantasy character. Beatrix is the 10th most popular Final Fantasy character of all time according to an IGN reader choice's poll. In 2020 NHK conducted an All-Final Fantasy Grand Poll of Japanese players, featuring over 468,000 votes. The poll results revealed that Beatrix was ranked the fifty second greatest Final Fantasy character by Japanese respondents.

The musical theme "Sword of Confusion" was discussed by Julian Whitney of Video Game Music Online as evoking Beatrix's "magical, yet dangerous power" and her knighthood. Nadia Oxford of USGamer drew a comparison between her and Final Fantasy VI character General Leo, citing their high power and turn away from the antagonist after its evils were revealed. Leo died in VI, which caused her to worry that Beatrix would die due to how powerful she was, but was relieved to discover that Beatrix survived to the end. Mario V. Marco of Hobby Consolas praised her as a standout character in the game, noting that he would have given it a perfect score if she was a main character. Scott Baird of Screen Rant noted that she would have been a more interesting pick for the main cast than the character Amarant.

Alex Donaldson of VG247 suggested in an interview that the designers of the fighting game Dissidia Final Fantasy NT should add Beatrix as a playable character in order to receive a perfect score from him. Connor Foss of Tech Raptor and Alex Donaldson of RPGSite were similarly hoping to see Beatrix made playable in the Dissidia Final Fantasy series.

References

Female characters in video games
Fictional bodyguards in video games
Fictional characters who can manipulate light
Fictional characters with disfigurements
Fictional characters with healing abilities
Fictional defectors
Fictional female generals
Fictional female knights
Fictional knights in video games
Fictional mass murderers
Fictional swordfighters in video games
Fictional war veterans
Final Fantasy characters
Final Fantasy IX
Video game bosses
Video game characters introduced in 2000
Video game characters who use magic
Video game characters with electric or magnetic abilities
Woman soldier and warrior characters in video games